Phacelia affinis is a species of flowering plant in the borage family, Boraginaceae, known by the common names limestone phacelia and purple-bell scorpionweed. It is native to the southwestern United States and Baja California and Sonora in Mexico. It can be found in scrub, woodland, forest, and other habitat.

It is an annual herb growing erect to a maximum height near 30 centimeters, its stem branching or not. The leaves are oblong in shape and are generally either deeply lobed or divided into several lobed leaflets. In texture the plant is slightly hairy and glandular. The inflorescence is a one-sided curving or coiling cyme of many bell-shaped flowers each just a few millimeters long. The flower is pale lavender or white with a yellowish tubular throat. The fruit is a capsule about half a centimeter long containing up to 30 seeds.

References

External links
Phacelia affinis — U.C. CalPhotos gallery

affinis
Flora of California
Flora of Baja California
Flora of Arizona
Flora of Nevada
Flora of New Mexico
Flora of Sonora
Flora of the California desert regions
Flora of the Great Basin
Flora of the Sonoran Deserts
Natural history of the California chaparral and woodlands
Natural history of the California Coast Ranges
Natural history of the Colorado Desert
Natural history of the Mojave Desert
Natural history of the Peninsular Ranges
Natural history of the Santa Monica Mountains
Natural history of the Transverse Ranges